Tinea belonota is a species of moth in the family Tineidae. It is endemic to New Zealand. It is classified as not threatened by the Department of Conservation.

Taxonomy 
It was described by Edward Meyrick in 1888 using a specimen collected in Palmerston North in March. This holotype specimen has not been found at the Natural History Museum, London. In 1926 Charles E. Clarke, thinking he was describing a new species, gave this moth the name Gymnobathra zephyrana. Alfred Philpott synonymised this name in 1931. The specimen Clarke used for this description was collected in Whangarei and is now held at the Auckland War Memorial Museum. The placement of this species within the genus Tinea is in doubt. As a result, this species is also known as Tinea (s.l.) belonota.

Description 
Meyrick described this species as follows:

This species is visually similar to Trithamnora certella and Tinea mochlota but can be distinguished as T. belonota has broader wings, lacks discal spots, has a more obvious pale streak, and different cilia.

Distribution 
This species is endemic to New Zealand. It has been collected in Palmerston North, Whangarei and at Okauia in the Waikato.

Conservation status 
This species has been classified as being "not threatened" under the New Zealand Threat Classification System.

References

Moths described in 1888
Tineinae
Moths of New Zealand
Endemic fauna of New Zealand
Taxa named by Edward Meyrick
Endemic moths of New Zealand